Longstanton is a village and civil parish in South Cambridgeshire, England,  north-west of Cambridge city centre. Longstanton occupies . Longstanton was created in 1953 from the two parishes of Long Stanton All Saints and Long Stanton St Michael. While the village is called Longstanton, the alternative form Long Stanton is still in use, for example when referring to the separate pre-1953 parishes, or to the current ecclesiastical parish.

History

For most of its history Longstanton was split into two parishes: the larger Long Stanton All Saints to the north and the smaller Long Stanton St. Michael to the south. The two may have been seen as distinct by 1086, when the Domesday Book referred to a "Stantone" and a "Stantune", and were certainly so by 1240, distinguished in Liber Memorandorum Ecclesie de Bernewelle as "Stanton" and "the other Stanton". The two villages were not formally amalgamated until 1953 and the two church parishes were permanently united in 1959.

The first known reference to the village, dating back to 1070 AD, calls the village "Stantonia" and describes it as "an enclosed settlement of stoney ground." By the time of the Domesday Book "Stantone" was one of the most populous villages in the area, with 67 peasant tenants being recorded. By 1563 this had dwindled to 42 families, and the settlement had been overtaken in size by other nearby villages such as Chesterton. The population fluctuated between 400 and 600 for several centuries; in the 1901 census there were 340 inhabitants of Longstanton All Saints parish and 93 inhabitants of Longstanton St Michael's parish (population of Longstanton was 443).

The three open fields of Longstanton All Saints and of Longstanton St Michael's were inclosed in 1816.

The village was transformed by the opening of RAF Oakington in 1940, resulting in the building of three new housing estates in the village and a trebling of the population. Although the airfield was in Oakington, all of the hangars, housing and other buildings were in Longstanton. Two bomber squadrons operated from RAF Oakington for the rest of the Second World War. There was also a photographic reconnaissance unit and a meteorological unit for a time during the war. Following the end of the war, the airfield was used by transport squadrons until 1950 and then by air training schools. The cemetery at the church of Longstanton All Saints contains a number of graves of servicemen who died either during or after the war. The graves are tended by the Commonwealth War Graves Commission.

The site became an army barracks in 1975 and on its closure in 1999 most of the housing was sold to private owners. The barracks buildings were used from 2000 to 2010 as an Immigration Reception Centre by the Home Office.

Government
Longstanton has its own civil parish council with eleven parish councillors. Longstanton is represented on South Cambridgeshire District Council by two councillors and on Cambridgeshire County Council by one councillor for the Longstanton, Northstowe and Over electoral division. Longstanton is in the parliamentary constituency of South Cambridgeshire, represented in the House of Commons by Anthony Browne.

Geography

It was first proposed in c.2003 that a substantial part of the land in the parish to the north and east of the village of Longstanton (including the brown-field site of the former RAF Oakington) would be used for the development of a new town called Northstowe. In 2012 outline planning consent was granted for the first phase of 1,500 houses, a new primary school and some local road improvements. The work to build a new primary school started in 2015.

Demography
The population of the village was recorded at 1,700 living in 772 households in the 2001 census. The development of new housing at Home Farm started circa 2005 and the population had increased to 2,657 in 1,095 households in the 2011 census. In the census of 2011, 92.4% of people described themselves as white, 2.0% as having mixed or multiple ethnic groups, 4.6% as being Asian or British Asian, and 1.0% as having another ethnicity. In that same census, 55.6% described themselves as Christian, 33.7% described themselves as having no religion, 6.5% did not specify a religion, 1.9% described themselves as Muslim, and 2.3% described themselves as having another religion.

Historical population

Census: Long Stanton All Saints 1801–1951, Census: Long Stanton St Michael 1801–1951, Census: Longstanton 2001–2011

Culture and community

Longstanton has a Village Institute (built in 1926) and a small number of shops and businesses, including a local supermarket that was opened in 2014 and a post office. There is a medical practice, dental practice and two veterinary practices. The recreation ground has facilities for football, cricket, and tennis. The bowls club was formed in 1985 at which time the bowls green was constructed. There is also a children's play area that was re-fitted with new equipment in 2015. Longstanton is on the route of the Pathfinder March and approximately 300 walkers and runners take part each year in an event to commemorate the work of the Pathfinder reconnaissance squadrons, some of whom were based at RAF Oakington.

The village contains one public house, the Black Bull, which is over 300 years old. A number of public houses in the village have closed including King William IV, Railway Tavern, The Red Cow (closed 1908) and The Hoops (closed in 1983).

Cultural references
Long Stanton station was immortalised in the Flanders and Swann song "Slow Train". A fictional Longstanton Spice Museum is mentioned in the British comedy series I'm Alan Partridge.

Education
The village has a primary school and is in the catchment area for Northstowe Secondary College and Swavesey Village College.

Transport
Long Stanton railway station on the Cambridge and Huntingdon line operated between 1847 and 1970. Despite surviving the Beeching Axe, passenger services to Long Stanton were ended in 1970. The route of the railway was developed as the Cambridgeshire Guided Busway, the world's longest guided busway. The busway opened in August 2011 and there is a stop with a park-and-ride car park at Longstanton close to the site of the old railway station. There are frequent daily services from Longstanton to Cambridge and St Ives along the busway. A bus service links Longstanton and surrounding villages with Cambridge.

A by-pass on the B1050 around the northern and western sides of Longstanton was opened in 2008. The A14 trunk road forms the south west boundary of the parish of Longstanton

Regional cycling route 24 and national cycling route 51 both pass through Longstanton. Longstanton is on the route of the long-distance, Pathfinder Long Distance Walk.

Religious sites

Longstanton is unusual among English villages in having two mediaeval churches - a reminder of its history as two parishes. The larger of the two churches, All Saints Church, is in the centre of the modern village and dates from the mid-14th Century, when it replaced an earlier church which was destroyed by a fire. It closed in 2003 due to a collapse of the ceiling, but reopened in 2007 after £10,000 was raised for repairs. It is a Grade I listed building.

St Michael's Church, situated towards the south of the village, is the smaller and older of the two churches, having been built around 1230. It is notable as a rare example of a church with a thatched roof (one of only two surviving in Cambridgeshire), and is a Grade II* listed building. It has not been used for regular worship since the amalgamation of the parishes, and is now maintained by the Churches Conservation Trust. Churches modelled after its architecture have been built as far away as Philadelphia (see Church of St. James the Less) and South Dakota.

A Wesleyan chapel was built in 1826 for the Cambridge circuit and later joined the Cottenham circuit in 1877, rejoining the Cambridge circuit in 1952. The chapel, which is located on Over Road, closed in 1970.

References

External links

Longstanton village site
Longstanton & District Heritage Society

Villages in Cambridgeshire
Civil parishes in Cambridgeshire
South Cambridgeshire District